The Lover is a 2002 Russian drama film directed by Valery Todorovsky.

Plot 
The film tells about two men, one of whom is a linguist, and the second is a retired military man, who are united by love for one woman.

Cast 
 Oleg Yankovsky as Charyshev
 Sergey Garmash as Ivan
 Andrey Smirnov as Petya
 Vera Voronkova as Vera
 Vladimir Yumatov as Adik
 Elena Laskavaya as Verbitskaya (as Elena Laskovaya)
 Valeriy Prokhorov as Conductor
 Irina Sokolova as Sima
 Irina Kartashyova as Liza (as Irina Kartashova)
 Pavel Adamchikov	
 Aleksandr Brankevich

References

External links 
 

2002 films
2000s Russian-language films
Russian drama films
2002 drama films
Films directed by Valery Todorovsky